Château du Mirail may refer to:

Château du Mirail (Brouqueyran)
Château du Mirail (Toulouse)